Cozmești may refer to several places in Romania:

 Cozmești, Iași, a commune in Iași County
 Cozmești, Vaslui, a commune in Vaslui County
 Cozmești, a village in Stolniceni-Prăjescu Commune, Iași County